Utvik Church is a parish church of the Church of Norway in Stryn Municipality in Vestland county, Norway. It is located in the village of Utvik. It is the church for the Utvik parish which is part of the Nordfjord prosti (deanery) in the Diocese of Bjørgvin. The white, wooden church was built in a long church design in 1840 using plans drawn up by the architect Hans Linstow. The church seats about 350 people.

History
The earliest existing historical records of the church date back to the year 1330, but the church was not new at that time. The first church was a wooden stave church that was likely built during the 13th century. The medieval church apparently existed until the early 17th century when it was torn down. In 1617, a new timber-framed cruciform church was built on the same site to replace the previous church. In 1840, the church was torn down and a new church was built on the same site. The new building was a wooden long church that was designed in a neo-gothic style by the architect Hans Linstow. The building was consecrated on 29 November 1840. In 1902, the church was renovated. The choir was enlarged and the east wall was in the shape of a half-octagon. In 1968, the choir was again enlarged, making it back into a rectangular shape as well as adding a sacristy and bathroom.

Media gallery

See also
List of churches in Bjørgvin

References

Stryn
Churches in Vestland
Long churches in Norway
Wooden churches in Norway
19th-century Church of Norway church buildings
Churches completed in 1840
13th-century establishments in Norway